Labuhanbatu Regency (Kabupaten Labuhanbatu, alternatively Kabupaten Labuhan Batu) is a regency of North Sumatra, Indonesia. Its seat is Rantau Prapat. It had an area of 9,322.5 km2 in 2000 (prior to the separation of the new North Labuhanbatu and South Labuhanbatu Regencies in 2007). Subsequently, the reduced regency has an area of 2,561.38 km2 and had a census population in 2010 of 415,248, which rose to 493,899 at the 2020 Census; the official estimate as at mid 2021 was 499,982.

The Panai Estuary, which consists of Bilah River and Barumun River are located in this regency, and it was the seat of ancient Buddhist trading kingdom of Pannai, c. 11th to 14th century, connected to the Bahal temple in North Padang Lawas Regency.

Administrative Districts 
Following the separation off of thirteen districts (kecamatan) to form the new North Labuhanbatu and South Labuhanbatu Regencies in 2007, the reduced regency is now divided administratively into nine districts, tabulated below with their areas and their populations at the 2010 Census and the 2020 Census, together with the official estimates as at mid 2021. The table also includes the locations of the district administrative centres, the number of villages (rural desa and urban kelurahan) in each district, and its post code.

Notes: (a) including the offshore island of Pulau Ongah Labuhan. (b) including the offshore island of Pulau Sikantan.

References 

Regencies of North Sumatra